The 5th European Badminton Championships were held in Dublin, Ireland, 6–7 April 1976, hosted by the European Badminton Union and the Badminton Union of Ireland.

Medalists

Semifinals

Final results

Medal account

References
Results at BE

European Badminton Championships
European Badminton Championships
European Badminton Championships, 1976
International sports competitions hosted by Ireland
Badminton tournaments in Ireland
1970s in Dublin (city)